Wesley Reid Scantlin (born June 9, 1972)  is an American singer, songwriter, and musician. He is best known as the lead vocalist, guitarist, and only constant member of rock band Puddle of Mudd. He was named one of the "Top 100 Heavy Metal Vocalists" by Hit Parader.

Career

Scantlin formed Puddle of Mudd in 1991. They released their debut EP Stuck in 1994, followed by a demo album called Abrasive in 1997. Four years later, the band added three new members and released their debut album Come Clean. In 2003, they released their second album, Life on Display. Their third album, Famous, was released in 2007, followed by Songs in the Key of Love & Hate in 2009 and Welcome to Galvania in 2019.

Scantlin sometimes tours with Alice in Chains guitarist Jerry Cantrell, joining Cantrell in playing acoustic renditions of Alice in Chains songs. He was also one of the musicians who participated in Alice in Chains' reunion tsunami benefit show, and was one of many artists who worked with Carlos Santana on his album All That I Am for the song "Just Feel Better". The song was recorded twice with both Scantlin and Steven Tyler, but only Tyler's version appears on the album.

Personal life
Scantlin attended Park Hill High School in Kansas City. He has a son named Jordan (born 1997) from a previous relationship. He married Jessica Nicole Smith in January 2008. They divorced in May 2012.

During an October 2017 show in Doncaster, South Yorkshire, Scantlin apologized to the audience for his on-and-offstage behaviour in previous years and admitted to struggling with addiction. He then announced his sobriety and began playing the song "Uh Oh", which he had previously written to address his problems.

Legal issues and controversies
In March 2002, Scantlin and his then-fiancée, actress Michelle Rubin, were both arrested for allegations of domestic violence after witnesses reported seeing the couple fighting on the side of California's Highway 126 while on their way to a video shoot. Several witnesses reported seeing Scantlin forcing Rubin into a Jeep Cherokee driven by an unknown third person. Scantlin and Rubin were released after posting $20,000 bail each.

During a February 22, 2004 show in Toledo, Ohio, Scantlin admitted to the audience that he was too intoxicated to continue after only four songs. Frustrated, his bandmates walked off.

On September 24, 2007, Scantlin was banned from Graceland after entering an off-limits swimming pool.

On December 11, 2011, Scantlin was pursued by the IRS for non-payment of back taxes in the region of $60,000.

On April 4, 2012, Scantlin was arrested for cocaine possession, driving under the influence, and driving without a license in Culver City, California. He agreed to attend rehab to erase his potential five-year jail sentence. On September 4, he was arrested for drunk and disorderly conduct on a cross-country flight from Boston to Los Angeles. The plane had to make an emergency landing in Austin, Texas, where Scantlin was charged with public intoxication.

In May 2013, Scantlin was arrested on domestic violence charges after he allegedly dragged ex-wife Jessica Nicole Smith and pulled her by the arm or shirt. In July, he was arrested on charges of felony vandalism after he used a buzzsaw to destroy property on his neighbor's patio.

On January 4, 2014, Scantlin was sued by American Express for non-payment of debt. During a show at Trees Dallas on April 16, he threw a microphone and beer into the audience, as well as appearing to threaten and attempt to physically attack members of the audience. He also received criticism as he appeared to be lip-syncing during the performance.

On January 16, 2015, Scantlin was arrested at Denver International Airport after taking a joyride on a baggage carousel and entering a restricted area. During a show on April 2, he smashed his guitar, headphones, and part of the drumkit before walking out. On April 15, he was arrested and charged for disorderly conduct at Milwaukee Mitchell International Airport. On July 26, he was arrested in the early morning after leading sheriff deputies on a high-speed chase in excess of 100 mph through Renville County, Minnesota. He faced a felony charge of fleeing a police officer in a motor vehicle and two gross misdemeanors of driving under the influence, but the charges were dropped. On August 5, he was arrested for driving under the influence in Sturgis, South Dakota.

On January 10, 2016, Scantlin tried to re-enter the house he had lost via foreclosure the previous year, and was arrested for destroying property inside the residence. On April 2, he was arrested at his Los Angeles home. In February, during a concert in Northampton, Pennsylvania, Scantlin berated the sound manager and threatened to call the "Kansas City Mafia" on him before ending the show early. On August 16, he was caught drinking just before a flight to Louisville, Kentucky. He was removed from the flight and had to cancel a scheduled performance in Louisville. On August 23, Scantlin's neighbors called police after witnessing him rigging a fake bomb onto his vehicles in an attempt to deter thieves from entering them. The mock explosive, consisting of wires attached to the car motor and a gas tank, caused the bomb squad to be called and four surrounding buildings to be evacuated.

On September 9, 2017, Scantlin was arrested at Los Angeles International Airport after he tried to board a plane with a BB gun. His bail was set at $850,000.

February 20 2023 Scantlin was arrested for trespassing at his former home he was released on $1,000 bail https://blabbermouth.net/news/puddle-of-mudds-wes-scantlin-arrested-again

Discography

References

1972 births
Living people
20th-century American singers
21st-century American singers
Alternative metal guitarists
Alternative rock guitarists
Alternative rock singers
American alternative rock musicians
American hard rock musicians
American male guitarists
American male singer-songwriters
American rock guitarists
American rock singers
American rock songwriters
Musicians from Kansas City, Missouri
Post-grunge musicians
Rhythm guitarists
20th-century American guitarists
21st-century American guitarists
Singer-songwriters from Missouri
Guitarists from Missouri
Puddle of Mudd members
20th-century American male singers
21st-century American male singers